Vladimir Romanovsky (June 21, 1957 in Slonim, Belarusian SSR – May 13, 2013) was a Soviet sprint canoeist who competed in the late 1970s and early 1980s. He won two medals at the 1976 Summer Olympics in Montreal with a gold in the K-2 1000 m and a silver in the K-2 500 m events.

Romanovsky also won three medals at the ICF Canoe Sprint World Championships with two golds (K-2 10000 m: 1981, K-4 10000 m: 1982) and a bronze (K-2 1000 m: 1977).

References

1957 births
2013 deaths
Canoeists at the 1976 Summer Olympics
Soviet male canoeists
Olympic canoeists of the Soviet Union
Olympic gold medalists for the Soviet Union
Olympic silver medalists for the Soviet Union
Olympic medalists in canoeing
Belarusian male canoeists
ICF Canoe Sprint World Championships medalists in kayak
People from Slonim
Honoured Masters of Sport of the USSR
Medalists at the 1976 Summer Olympics
Sportspeople from Grodno Region